The 2018 Mississippi State Bulldogs baseball team represents the Mississippi State University in the 2018 NCAA Division I baseball season. The Bulldogs play their home games at Dudy Noble Field. Due to construction of the new Dudy Noble Field, the first home game was not played until March 6, to give construction crews time to finish the bottom seating of the stadium. The new Dudy Noble Field in its entirety will not be completed until the 2019 season.

Personnel

Coaching staff

Schedule and results

† Indicates the game does not count toward the 2018 Southeastern Conference standings.
*Rankings are based on the team's current ranking in the Collegiate Baseball poll.

Record vs. conference opponents

Rankings

MLB Draft

†Small, a redshirt sophomore, returns to MSU for the next season.
‡Mangum, a junior, returns to MSU for the next season. Although Mangum had almost exclusively played CF in college and pitched very little, he was drafted as a pitcher.

Recruiting
Mississippi State is ranked 8th by Perfect Game for its 2018 recruiting class, in spite of having two players, Carter Stewart and J. T. Ginn, both RHPs, go in the 1st round of the MLB draft and two more, Eric Cerantola and Sam Knowlton, both also RHPs, go in the 33rd and 39th, who did not sign to play professionally after this draft, although there is some speculation that Stewart may go JUCO instead. Stewart does go JUCO and after all teams have defections due to major league signings, Mississippi State is ranked 6th. Perfect Game only covers commitments out of high school. There is also a JUCO player, Gunner Halter, SS, taken in the 26th round who plans to play for Mississippi State. There are also two high schoolers that were not drafted, probably due to difficulty of being signed, who were projected as top 10 rounders, Hayden Jones, C, and Christian McLeod, LHP. In addition to the four RHPs, C, LHP, and JUCO SS mentioned above, high school players also include three OFs, a RHP, two SSs, and a C.

References

Mississippi State
Mississippi State Bulldogs baseball seasons
Mississippi State Bulldogs baseball
Mississippi State
College World Series seasons